Corinth is an unincorporated community in Lincoln Parish, Louisiana, United States.

Notes

Unincorporated communities in Lincoln Parish, Louisiana
Unincorporated communities in Louisiana
Ruston, Louisiana micropolitan area